The 2017 Bank of America 500 was a Monster Energy NASCAR Cup Series race that was held on October 8, 2017, at Charlotte Motor Speedway in Concord, North Carolina. Contested over 337 laps -- extended from 334 laps due to an overtime finish, on the 1.5 mile (2.4 km) intermediate speedway, it was the 30th race of the 2017 Monster Energy NASCAR Cup Series season, fourth race of the Playoffs, and first race of the Round of 12.

Report

Background

The race was held at Charlotte Motor Speedway, a motorsports complex located in Concord, North Carolina, United States. The complex features a  quad-oval track that hosts NASCAR racing including the prestigious Coca-Cola 600 on Memorial Day weekend, the Sprint All-Star Race, and the Bank of America 500. The speedway was built in 1959 by Bruton Smith and is considered the home track for NASCAR with many race teams located in the Charlotte area. The track is owned and operated by Speedway Motorsports, Inc. (SMI) with Marcus G. Smith (son of Bruton Smith) as track president.

The  complex also features a state-of-the-art quarter mile (0.40 km) drag racing strip, ZMAX Dragway. It is the only all-concrete, four-lane drag strip in the United States and hosts NHRA events. Alongside the drag strip is a state-of-the-art clay oval that hosts dirt racing including the World of Outlaws finals among other popular racing events.

Entry list

First practice

Qualifying

Qualifying results

Practice (post-qualifying)
Both practice sessions for Saturday were canceled due to rain.

Race

Race results

Stage results

Stage 1
Laps: 90

Stage 2
Laps: 90

Final stage results

Stage 3
Laps: 154

Race statistics
 Lead changes: 8 among different drivers
 Cautions/Laps: 10 for 44
 Red flags: 0
 Time of race: 3 hours, 38 minutes and 0 seconds
 Average speed:

Media

Television
NBC Sports covered the race on the television side. Rick Allen and Dale Jarrett had the call in the regular booth for the race. Jeff Burton and Steve Letarte had the call in the NBC's Stock Car Smarts Booth for the race. Dave Burns, Parker Kligerman, Marty Snider and Kelli Stavast reported from pit lane during the race.

Radio
The Performance Racing Network had the radio call for the race, which was simulcast on Sirius XM NASCAR Radio.

Standings after the race

Drivers' Championship standings

Manufacturers' Championship standings

Note: Only the first 16 positions are included for the driver standings.

References

Bank of America 500
Bank of America 500
NASCAR races at Charlotte Motor Speedway
Bank of America 500